Basselinia tomentosa is a species of flowering plant in the family Arecaceae. It is found only in New Caledonia.

References

tomentosa
Endemic flora of New Caledonia
Vulnerable plants
Taxa named by Odoardo Beccari
Taxonomy articles created by Polbot